Came glasswork is the process of joining cut pieces of art glass through the use of came strips or foil into picturesque designs in a framework of soldered metal.

Final products include a wide range of glasswork, including stained glass and lead light pieces. Came is made of different metals, such as lead, zinc, brass and copper. The metal came selected generally depends upon the size, complexity and weight of the project. As an alternative to came, copper foil may be used, for small, intricate pieces.

Overview
Came glasswork includes assembling pieces of cut and possibly painted glass using came sections. The joints where the came meet are soldered to bind the sections. When all of the glass pieces have been put within came and a border put around the entire work, pieces are cemented and supported as needed. The work may be made waterproof by forcing a soft oily cement or mastic between the glass and the cames. A form of embellishment and gilding, such as Angel gilding and Eglomise, may be added to finish the piece.

Works may need to be reinforced, like large pieces or ones that will be exposed to the outdoor elements. Support can be provided as the piece is made through the use of reinforced and metal-covered lead came, the use of steel strips in the came channels, or use of rigid cames, such as copper, brass or zinc. Bars of steel or steel rebar may be attached to the back of finished works as reinforcement.

History
Theophilus Presbyter, the first to write about joining art glass using the came technique in the book De Divers Artibus. Theophilus was a Benedictine Monk who was a glass and pigment worker who practiced in the late 11th and early 12th centuries.

Materials
Materials to complete a glasswork project may include the pattern, cut glass, came, wood trim, solder, cement. Additional supplies include newspaper, cutter oil, a plywood board, masking tape, flux, and whiting.

Came
Lead came is often supplied in lengths of 2 m and in widths of differing sizes. It also comes in flat or domed profiles.

Brass and copper
Brass and copper have been used to bring a copper or golden hue to the works. Generally, though, they were used only for windows between about 1890 and 1920. Both metals were often alternatives to zinc for Frank Lloyd Wright designed windows.

Brass-capped lead
Brass-capped lead is another type of came used for glasswork projects.

Lead
The traditional method of creating "camework glass" uses lead came, which ages into a dark blue-gray patina. In comparison to other came metal strips, like brass, copper and zinc, lead is softer and more flexible, making it easier to cut and bend. It's also inexpensive and durable. A downside is that the finished projects may be prone to sagging due to lead's softness. This can be mitigated somewhat by stretching the lead to make it more rigid before it is used. Special precautions should be taken when working with this metal came to avoid lead contamination.

The lead came windows of the medieval churches are sturdier than those of the 19th century and much of the 20th century. The composition of lead came changed over time, at first by removing other metals to make a "pure lead" and then again during war years when lead was needed for ammunition. Since the 1970s a new form of lead, restoration lead, was developed based upon medieval lead's metal composition. Restoration lead is stronger than lead came of the prior 100 years or so.

Water tightness is achieved by brushing cement under the flanges of the leads to both faces prior to installation or by applying putty afterwards. Typically the cement consisted of linseed oil, whiting, lamp black and white spirit.

Zinc
Zinc makes a lightweight, strong and rigid came, which lends itself to glasswork projects that don't have many curved lines, are large, or have a number of straight lines that require greater support than lead would afford. Zinc accepts finishes, such as black and copper. Because of its strength, zinc is often used for border cames, which are U-channel cames for the outside edges.

Frank Lloyd Wright used zinc came for his stained glass windows. Beveled glass work is generally done in zinc came, primarily because of its ability to manage the weight of heavy plate glass; whereas beveled glass works made of lead came are much more likely to buckle or sag over time.

Copper foil

Copper foil is an easy, versatile alternative to came and is particularly useful for small projects. Using copper foil, the edges of the glass pieces are wrapped with adhesive copper tape and soldered together along the adjacent copper strips. A patent for the method of "Joining Glass Mosaics" was issued to Sanford Bray in 1886,  This new method of joining pieces of stained glass used copper/copper foil instead of lead sashes. By using copper foil, one could now make cylinders, cones, and globe-shaped shades or many other irregular forms.

Tools
Tools to complete a glasswork project can include:

 brushes: toothbrush, scrub brush, flux brush or cotton swabs
 carbide grinding stone
 cloths
 cork-backed straightedge
 crimper or burnisher, for copper foil
 glass cutter
 glass grinder
 glazing hammer
 gloves
 hammer and horseshoe nails
 lathekin
 mask: dust mask or respirator
 metal files
 patinas
 permanent marker
 pliers: breaker-grozier, combination, running
 safety glasses
 saw: miter came saw, hacksaw or side cutters
 scissors
 soldering iron
 sponge
 utility knife
 vise
 wire brush

See also
 Qamariya

Notes

References

Further reading
 Heinz, Thomas A. (September/October 1989). "Use & Repair of Zinc Cames in Art-Glass Windows". Old House Journal. pp. 35–38.
 Stained Glass Association of America (1992). SGAA Reference & Technical Manual. Second Edition. Lee's Summit, MO: The Stained Glass Association of America.

Restoration
 Department of Interior (2004). The Preservation of Historic Architecture: The U.S. Government's Official Guidelines for Preserving Historic Homes. Lyons Press Series. Globe Pequot. pp. 397–403. .
 The Census of Stained Glass Windows in America (1988). The Conservation and Restoration of Stained Glass: An Owner's Guide. Raleigh, NC: Stained Glass Associates.

Glass art
Artistic techniques
Medieval art
Stained glass

ar:زجاج معشق بصفائح النحاس
de:Bleiglasfenster